The Duchy of Saxe-Marksuhl was one of the Saxon Duchies held by the Ernestine line of the Wettin Dynasty. Established in 1662 for John George I, third son of Wilhelm, Duke of Saxe-Weimar.  Originally John George was supposed to share Saxe-Eisenach with his older brother, Adolf William. Johann Georg finally accepted the receipt of an income from the duchy of Saxe-Eisenach and made his residence in the small town of Marksuhl.  Saxe-Marksuhl was reincorporated into Saxe-Eisenach on the accession of John George to the Duchy of Saxe-Eisenach upon his nephew's death in 1671.

Duke of Saxe-Marksuhl
 John George I (1662–1671)

References

1662 establishments in the Holy Roman Empire
1671 disestablishments in the Holy Roman Empire
States and territories established in 1662
Marksuhl